The second season of Nip/Tuck premiered on June 22, 2004 and concluded on October 5, 2004. It consisted of 16 episodes.

Cast and characters

Main cast 
 Dylan Walsh as Dr. Sean McNamara
 Julian McMahon as Dr. Christian Troy
 John Hensley as Matt McNamara
 Roma Maffia as Liz Cruz
 Joely Richardson as Julia McNamara

Special guest stars
 Vanessa Redgrave as Erica Noughton
 Famke Janssen as Ava Moore
 Alec Baldwin as Dr. Barrett Moore
 Joan Rivers as herself (uncredited)

Recurring cast

Episodes

U.S television ratings

Reception 
The second season received positive reviews from critics, holding an 86% fresh rating on Rotten Tomatoes, an increase from the first season. People wrote "The second season of Nip/Tuck seems giddily determined to top the first", whilst David Bianculli of the New York Daily News wrote "The FX series begins its second year with assurance, inventiveness and more than a little boldness. If you're missing the sassy frankness and playfulness of Sex and the City, look no further: The torch has been passed." Brian Lowry of Variety wrote "Program creator Ryan Murphy has consistently made like Fred Astaire, dancing up to the edge of 'too far' without toppling over." Steve Johnson of the Chicago Tribune gave a less favorable review, saying "Amid this determined luridness, the show tries to stick in some 'real' drama, and the effect is knock-you-off-your-seat disconcerting."

References 

Nip/Tuck
2004 American television seasons